Theta Centauri or θ Centauri, officially named Menkent, is a single star in the southern constellation of Centaurus, the centaur. With an apparent visual magnitude of +2.06, it is the fourth-brightest member of the constellation. Based on parallax measurements obtained during the Hipparcos mission, it is about  distant from the Sun.

Nomenclature

θ Centauri, Latinised to Theta Centauri, is the star's Bayer designation.

It bore the traditional name of Menkent derived from the Arabic word مَنْكِب‎ (mankib)for "shoulder" (of the Centaur), apparently blended with a shortened form of "kentaurus" (centaur). In 2016, the International Astronomical Union organized a Working Group on Star Names (WGSN) to catalog and standardize proper names for stars. The WGSN approved the name Menkent for this star on 21 August 2016 and it is now so included in the List of IAU-approved Star Names.

Properties 

This is an evolved giant star with a stellar classification of K0 III and 1.27 times the mass of the Sun. The outer envelope has an effective temperature of 4,980 K, giving it the orange-hued glow of a cool, K-type star.

References

K-type giants
Centaurus (constellation)
Centauri, Theta
Durchmusterung objects
Centauri, 5
0539
123139
068933
5288
Menkent